Emmanuel Sarkodie (born 10 April 1996) is a Ghanaian professional footballer who plays as midfielder for Ghana Premier League side Asante Kotoko S.C. Born and bred in Kumasi, he previously played for and captained Nkoranza Warriors SC before being snapped by Asante Kotoko in 2020.

Early life 
Sarkodie hails from Abura-Dunkwa but was born and bred in Kumasi the capital city of the Ashanti Region of Ghana.

Club career

Nkoranza Warriors 
Sarkodie played for and captained Ghana Division One League side Nkoranza Warriors SC for 3 years before signing for Kumasi Asante Kotoko. In 2020, he was linked to Aduana Stars, Hearts of Oak, Legon Cities, Eleven Wonders and Asante Kotoko during the transfer season. He played alongside Kwame Opoku whilst at Nkoranza Warriors. Opoku also moved to Kotoko in 2020.

Asante Kotoko 
In March 2020, after being linked with 5 clubs in the Ghana Premier League; Hearts of Oak, Aduana Stars, Legon Cities, Asante Kotoko and Eleven Wonders, he opted to sign for the Kumasi-based club Asante Kotoko. On 28 March 2020, Asante Kotoko announced that they had signed him on a 3-year deal from Nkoranza Warriors for an undisclosed amount. He was part of the squad that featured for the club during the 2020–21 CAF Champions League. He made his debut on 15 November 2020 in a 1–1 draw to Eleven Wonders, coming on in the 57th minute for Abdul Latif Anabila. On 11 January 2021, he played the full 90 minutes and made one assist to Kwame Opoku to score in a 2–0 win over Liberty Professionals.

On 17 January 2021, he provided an assist for Kwame Opoku to score an equalizer to a goal scored by Daniel Lomotey to help Kotoko to a 1–1 draw against West African Football Academy (WAFA). He played 83 minutes and was substituted for Salifu Mudasiru during a 2–0 win over league leaders Karela United on 7 February 2021 to help move Kotoko into the top spot.

References

External links 
 
 
 

1996 births
Living people
Association football midfielders
Ghanaian footballers
Asante Kotoko S.C. players
Ghana Premier League players
Footballers from Kumasi